Matthew Elliott Wells (born 22 September 1988) is an English professional football coach and former player, who played as a central midfielder. He was formerly the assistant head coach to Scott Parker at AFC Bournemouth. On 31 December 2022, Wells joined the team of head coach Scott Parker at Club Brugge

Wells worked his way up through the youth ranks of Tottenham Hotspur, from the age of nine. Unfortunately, Wells never made a senior debut, with his career at the North London club severely hampered by injuries. As a result, he focused upon football coaching and successfully gained his UEFA B Licence at the age of just 20, whilst learning from the likes of John McDermott and Alex Inglethorpe.

Early life
Wells was born in Enfield, Greater London, and attended The John Warner School in Hoddesdon.

Personal life
Wells is the grandson of former Wales international and Tottenham Hotspur player, Cliff Jones. He is also the cousin of professional footballer, Scott Neilson, who had spells at Crawley Town, Luton Town, and Grimsby Town, amongst others.

Managerial statistics

References

1988 births
Living people
English footballers